Francis Bouillet (7 October 1901 – 10 May 1951) was a French racing cyclist. He rode in the 1929 Tour de France.

References

1901 births
1951 deaths
French male cyclists
Place of birth missing